Kushal Srivastava is an Indian film director and producer. He is best known for his films like Vodka Diaries, Speed Dial, and The Job. He is an Ex Air Warrior who served in the Indian Air Force for seven years as Equipment Assistant in Logistics department.

Career 
Srivastava made his directing debut with the film Vodka Diaries featuring Kay Kay Menon, Raima Sen, Mandira Bedi and Sharib Hashmi. His film Vodka Diaries selected in Jagran Film Festival. He also directed short films like Love Birds and Speed Dial and Kaafir. His short films The job and Love birds got nomination in Filmfare Awards.

Filmography 
Vodka Diaries featuring Kay Kay Menon, Raima Sen , Mandira Bedi & Sharib Hashmi
Speed Dial featuring Shreyas Talpade & Aksha Pardasany
The Job featuring Kalki Koechlin

References 

Indian film directors
Indian film producers
Living people
Year of birth missing (living people)